Peter Christie (October 30, 1846 – December 13, 1933) was a Canadian politician.

Born in Reach Township, Ontario County, Canada West, the son of John Christie and Jane McLaren, both Scottish, Christie was a farmer by occupation. He was County Councilor for 30 years and Warden of the County in 1881. He was three years President of the Clydesdale Association of Canada. He was first elected to the House of Commons of Canada for the electoral district of Ontario South in the general elections of 1904. A Conservative, he was defeated in 1908.

References
 
 The Canadian Parliament; biographical sketches and photo-engravures of the senators and members of the House of Commons of Canada. Being the tenth Parliament, elected November 3, 1904

1846 births
1933 deaths
Conservative Party of Canada (1867–1942) MPs
Members of the House of Commons of Canada from Ontario
Canadian people of Scottish descent